Donnchad mac Dómnaill Clóen was the tenth and last King of Leinster to be inaugurated and based on Lyons Hill, Ardclough, County Kildare.  He was a member of the Uí Dúnchada, one of three septs of the Uí Dúnlainge dynasty which rotated the kingship of Leinster between 750 - 1050 and is a significant figure in County Kildare History. He was deposed in 1003. Máel Mórda mac Murchada of the Uí Fáeláin sept replaced him as king.

Primary Source 
According to the Annals of Tigernach, in the year 999AD:

 T999.1 Donnchadh son of Domhnall Claon, king of Leinster, was captured by Sitric son of Olaf.

11th-century deaths
10th-century kings of Leinster
Year of birth unknown